The 1928 College Football All-America team is composed of college football players who were selected as All-Americans by various organizations and writers that chose College Football All-America Teams in 1928. The seven selectors recognized by the NCAA as "official" for the 1928 season are (1) Collier's Weekly, as selected by Grantland Rice, (2) the Associated Press, (3) the United Press, (4) the All-America Board, (5) the International News Service (INS), (6) the Newspaper Enterprise Association (NEA), and (7) the North American Newspaper Alliance (NANA).

Consensus All-Americans
Following the death of Walter Camp in 1925, there was a proliferation of All-American teams in the late 1920s. For the year 1929, the NCAA recognizes seven published All-American teams as "official" designations for purposes of its consensus determinations. The following chart identifies the NCAA-recognized consensus All-Americans and displays which first-team designations they received.  Army halfback Red Cagle was the only player to be unanimously selected by all seven selectors as a first-team All-American.

All-American selections for 1928

Key
Bold – NCAA "consensus" All-Americans

Selectors recognized by NCAA in its consensus All-American determinations:
 AAB = All America Board
 AP = Associated Press
 COL = Collier's Weekly, as selected by Grantland Rice with assistance from Knute Rockne,  Glenn Warner, Jesse Hawley, Fielding H. Yost, Robert Zuppke, Lou Young, Bill Roper, Wallace Wade, Dan McGugin and Clarence M. Price.
 NEA = Newspaper Enterprise Association
 UP = United Press, as selected by United Press sports editor Frank Getty, with advice from "coaches and officials throughout the country."
 INS = International News Service
 NANA = North American Newspaper Alliance

Other selectors:
 CP = Central Press Association, billed as the "Real" All-American team
 PAB = Pan-American Bank
 WC = Walter Camp Football Foundation
 1 – First Team Selection
 2 – Second Team Selection
 3 – Third Team Selection
 Utility Selection – Only Grantland Rice in Collier's Weekly used this designation for three players in addition to those at eleven specified positions.
 HM – Honorable Mention Selection – Used by Frank Getty in the United Press All-America Team.

Ends
 Irvine Phillips, California (UP-1, WC-1, AAB, NANA, PAB, AP-2)
 Wes Fesler, Ohio State (College Football Hall of Fame) (CO-1, INS, NEA-1, UP-1, WC-1, AAB, AP-2, CP-2)
 Dale Van Sickel, Florida (College Football Hall of Fame) (AP-1, NEA-1, CO-Utility, UP-HM)
 Malcolm Franklin, St. Mary's (AP-1, UP-2)
 Ken Haycraft, Minnesota (CO-1, NANA, UP-2)
 Dick Abernathy, Vanderbilt (CP-1, UP-3)
 Theodore Rosenzweig, Carnegie Tech (CP-1, INS, NEA-2, UP-HM)
 Edward Messinger, Army (PAB, CP-2, AP-3)
 Miller Brown, Missouri (AP-3)
 George Barna, Hobart (UP-3)

Tackles
 Otto Pommerening, Michigan (AP-1, CO-1, INS, UP-1, NEA-3)
 Mike Getto, Pittsburgh (CO-1, NANA, NEA-1, WC-1, AP-2, UP-2, AAB)
 Forrest Douds, Washington & Jefferson (UP-1, CO-Utility)
 Jesse Hibbs, USC (CP-1, NEA-1, UP-3)
 Gordy Brown, Texas (CP-1, AP-2, UP-3)
 Butch Nowack, Illinois (WC-1, UP-2, AP-3, AAB, NANA)
 Russell Crane, Illinois (CP-1)
 Frank Speer, Georgia Tech (AP-1)
 Alfred "Al" Lassman, New York Univ. (CP-2, NEA-2)
 Bud Sprague, Army (CP-2)
 Jimmy Steele, Florida (NEA-2)
 Melvyl Dressell, Washington State (AP-3)
 Steve Bancroft, California (PAB)
 Fred Miller, Notre Dame (INS, PAB)

Guards
 Seraphim Post, Stanford (AP-1, CO-1, CP-1, INS, NEA-1, WC-1, AAB)
 Don Robesky, Stanford (UP-1, NANA, NEA-2)
 Edward Burke, Navy (AP-1, CO-1, CP-2, NEA-2)
 George Gibson, Minnesota (UP-1, WC-1, AP-2, NEA-3, AAB)
 Danny McMullen, Nebraska (AP-2, INS, NEA-3, UP-3, PAB)
 Leroy Wietz, Illinois (NANA)
 Bill McRae, Florida (UP-2)
 Bull Brown, Vanderbilt (UP-2)
 Bruce Dumont, Colgate (AP-3)
 Choc Sanders, SMU (AP-3, UP-3)
 Waldo Wittenmeyer Greene, Yale (CP-2)
 John Dreshar, Carnegie Tech (PAB)

Centers
 Peter Pund, Georgia Tech (College Football Hall of Fame) (CO-1, INS, NEA-1, UP-1, WC-1, CP-2, AP-3, AAB)
 Charles Howe, Princeton (AP-1, CP-1, NEA-2, UP-2, NANA; PAB)
 Nate Barragar, USC (AP-2)
 Tim Moynihan, Notre Dame (UP-3)

Quarterbacks
 Howard Harpster, Carnegie Tech (College Football Hall of Fame) (CO-1, CP-1, NEA-1, UP-1, WC-1, AP-3, PAB, AAB)
 Dutch Clark, Colorado College (College and Pro Football Hall of Fame) (AP-1)
 Howard Maple, Oregon State (AP-2, UP-3)
 Frederick L. Hovde, Minnesota (CP-2)
 Don Williams, USC (NANA, UP-2)

Halfbacks
 Chris Cagle, Army (College Football Hall of Fame) (AP-1, CO-1, CP-1, INS, NANA, NEA-1, UP-1, WC-1, PAB, AAB)
 Chuck Carroll, Washington (AP-1, UP-1 [fb], WC-1, NEA-2, AAB)
 Paul Scull, Penn (CO-1, INS, NANA, NEA-1, WC-1, AP-2, UP-2 [fb], AAB)
 Warner Mizell, Georgia Tech (AP-2, CP-2, INS, NANA, NEA-2, UP-2)
 Clyde Crabtree, Florida (AP-3, NEA-3, UP-3 [fb])
 Willis Glassgow, Iowa (CP-2, AP-3, NEA-3)
 Bill Banker, Tulane (College Football Hall of Fame) (UP-2)
 Lloyd Brazil, Univ. of Detroit (CO-Utility, UP-3)
 Redman Hume, Southern Methodist (UP-3)
 Lloyd Thomas, Univ. South. Calif. (NEA-2, PAB)

Fullbacks
 Ken Strong, New York Univ. (AP-1, CO-1, CP-1 [hb], INS, NEA-1, UP-1 [hb])
 Blue Howell, Nebraska (CP-1)
 Clifford Hoffman, Stanford (AP-2)
 Gerald Snyder, Maryland (AP-3)
 Herschel Burgess, Texas A&M (CP-2)
 Mayes McLain, Iowa (PAB)

See also
 1928 All-Big Six Conference football team
 1928 All-Big Ten Conference football team
 1928 All-Pacific Coast Conference football team
 1928 All-Southern football team
 1928 All-Southwest Conference football team

References

All-America Team
College Football All-America Teams